Graciela Soto Cámara is a Mexican model who represented her country in Miss International 1999.

Nuestra Belleza Mexico
Born in Morelos and raised in Cuernavaca, Soto competed against thirty-two other contestants for the national beauty title of Mexico, Nuestra Belleza México, held in Pachuca, Hidalgo on September, 1999.

Miss International 1999
Despite not winning her country's national title, she was chosen to represent Mexico in the 1999 Miss International pageant, held on 14 December 1999 at Tokyo's U-Port Hall, where she was a favorite to win the Best National Costume award.

References

Living people
People from Morelos
Miss International 1999 delegates
Nuestra Belleza México winners
Year of birth missing (living people)
People from Cuernavaca